Mir Amir Ali (21 June 1939 – 20 June 1985) was an Indian cricketer. He played five first-class matches for Hyderabad between 1957 and 1963.

See also
 List of Hyderabad cricketers

References

External links
 

1939 births
1985 deaths
Indian cricketers
Hyderabad cricketers
Cricketers from Hyderabad, India